The Playroom is a video game first created in 1989 for DOS, Apple II and Macintosh computers. The game was compatible with the TouchWindow utility. It was ported to the Amiga and FM Towns computers in 1992 and 1994 respectively and then remade for Microsoft Windows and Macintosh in 1995. It was designed for ages 3 to 6 (preschool through first grade) manufactured by Broderbund. A follow up game titled The Treehouse came in 1991 as well as a sequel to this game, called The Backyard in 1993.

Gameplay
This video game featured Pepper Mouse and is set in his playroom. Clicking on toys and areas of the playroom will activate animated surprises or open an activity. Activities include the spinner, a simple counting game with four difficulty levels; an ABC book, where objects can be placed on two different scenes; the computer, which teaches spelling and getting familiar with the keyboard; the cuckoo clock, which teaches how to tell time; the mousehole game, which is a dice-rolling game with three skill levels; and the mix-up toy, in which heads, torsos and legs from various characters can be customised. The 1995 remake includes additional content to the existing activities and the presence of Pepper's sister Ginger.

Educational goals
The game is designed to make younger players comfortable to their surroundings as they become absorbed in the activities, helps them get ready for school and offers them learning opportunities in a non-threatening manner. Literacy skills are not required to play it. Topics in the game include simple math, reading, time and reasoning skills. It pays great attention to detail, clearly spelling out meanings to make reading letters and words plus typing easy. There are also activities to teach telling the time, counting and using imagination. The user manual also includes fun activities to add to enjoyment. Copies of the game also came with a stuffed toy of Pepper Mouse. Aided by this software, Children can learn and advance at their own pace and play in their own way.

Reception

The Playroom won six Early Learning Awards. Computer Gaming World gave the game four stars out of five, calling it "clever and engaging" and placed it as one of the SPA Top Hits for Home Education.

The game was reviewed in the Oppenheim Toy Portfolio Guide Book where the authors described it as "virtual reality for three- to six-year-olds" and claimed that "[t]here is real education going on behind the scenes of this creative playroom".

Availability
The game was included on a twin CD pack along with "Jamie Discovers Math".

References

External links
Official Site

1989 video games
1992 video games
1994 video games
1995 video games
Children's educational video games
North America-exclusive video games
DOS games
Amiga games
Windows games
Apple II games
FM Towns games
Broderbund games
Infogrames games
Classic Mac OS games
Video games about mice and rats
Video games about toys
Video games developed in the United States